Mar Augustine Memorial Higher Secondary School (MAMHSS) is a higher secondary school situated in Koratty, Thrissur district, Kerala,  having both English and Malayalam as teaching media. The school is named after Mar Augustine Kandathil who was the first and longest serving metropolitan and head of the syro-malabar church. The school was established in the year 1945 and was known as mar Augustine School at that time and later became a high school and recently a higher secondary school. It was a non residential, Co-ed school in the beginning but in 1970 it became boy high school but was again brought back to co-ed status in recent years.

References

Christian schools in Kerala
High schools and secondary schools in Kerala
Schools in Thrissur district
Educational institutions established in 1945
1945 establishments in India